Peterborough County is located in Southern Ontario, Canada. The county seat is Peterborough, which is independent of the county.

The southern section of the county is mix of agriculture, urban and lakefront properties. The northern section of the county is mostly sparsely populated wilderness with numerous rivers and lakes, mostly within the recently expanded Kawartha Highlands Provincial Park.

The County contains the Lang Pioneer Village, and the Kawarthas are a major tourist region.

History

Origins and evolution
In 1615, Samuel de Champlain was one of the first western explorers who traveled through the area, coming down from Lake Chemong and portaging down a trail, which is approximated by present-day Chemong Road, to the Otonabee River and stayed for a brief time near the present-day site of Bridgenorth, just north of Peterborough.

The area was initially part of Northumberland County, which was formed by proclamation of the first Lieutenant Governor of Upper Canada, John Graves Simcoe in 1792, and defined by statute in 1798.  In 1802, Northumberland was included in the Newcastle District. In 1841, the northern part of the District was detached to form the Colborne District, with the northern portion of Northumberalnd county made into the new County of Peterborough. It consisted of the following territory:

The county was named in honor of Col. Peter Robinson, who in 1825 brought 2,000 settlers from Ireland. The route taken was by way of Port Hope, Rice Lake and the Otonabee River, the same route used by the first settlers that entered this region in 1818.

The centre of the County was originally the courthouse, which is still considered an important historical site.

In 1851, Peterborough County was divided into the counties of Peterborough and Victoria, which were united for municipal purposes as the United Counties of Peterborough and Victoria.

A plebiscite was authorized in 1856 to facilitate the creation of a provisional county council for Victoria, but, as the united counties council delayed conducting it, a further Act was passed in 1861 to compel its being held, following which the provisional council was formed. and its formal separation took place in 1863.

Further townships were surveyed, thus extending the reach of the County northwards. In 1874, the townships of Bruton, Cardiff, Dysart, Dudley, Glamorgan, Guilford, Harburn, Harcourt, Minden, Monmouth, Snowden and Stanhope were withdrawn from the County and transferred to the new Provisional County of Haliburton.

After the transfer of the northern townships to Haliburton, the remainder of the County consisted of the following:

The Town of Peterborough became a City in 1905, and was subsequently withdrawn from the County for municipal purposes.

In 1974, as a result of the creation of the Regional Municipality of Durham, the township of Cavan and the village of Millbrook were withdrawn from Durham County, and the township of South Monaghan was withdrawn from Northumberland County, to be transferred to Peterborough County.

Current municipalities
As a consequence of the Common Sense Revolution in Ontario, the County was restructured into the following municipalities during the period 1997-2004:

 Township of Asphodel-Norwood
 Township of Cavan-Monaghan
 Township of Douro-Dummer
 Township of Havelock-Belmont-Methuen
 Township of North Kawartha
 Township of Otonabee-South Monaghan
 Township of Selwyn
 Municipality (Township) of Trent Lakes

Two First Nations reserves are independent of county administration:

 Curve Lake First Nation 35
 Hiawatha First Nation

Demographics

Major places

Cities

Peterborough, Ontario

Towns/Villages
Buckhorn, Ontario
Lakefield, Ontario
Norwood, Ontario
Havelock, Ontario
Douro, Ontario
Apsley, Ontario
Millbrook, Ontario
Bridgenorth, Ontario

Media
In 1994, the Connection newspaper (previously known as Causeway Connection) established in Selwyn in central Peterborough County. The free monthly cottage country newspaper is distributed by mail, providing non-partisan news and information. The Connection is expanding both its distribution areas and internet presence.

See also
List of municipalities in Ontario
List of townships in Ontario
List of secondary schools in Ontario#Peterborough County

Notes

References

External links

 
Counties in Ontario